Mandale is an unincorporated community in southeastern Washington Township, Paulding County, Ohio, United States.  It lies at the intersection of State Routes 66 and 114.

Mandale was the home of the Pink Star ice cream shop which was abandoned and now sits in ruin.

References

Unincorporated communities in Paulding County, Ohio
Unincorporated communities in Ohio